The Swale is a tidal channel of the Thames estuary that separates the Isle of Sheppey from the rest of Kent.  On its banks is a  biological Site of Special Scientific Interest which stretches from Sittingbourne to Whitstable in Kent. It is also a Ramsar internationally important wetland site and a Special Protection Area under the European Union Directive on the Conservation of Wild Birds. Parts of it are a  Nature Conservation Review site, Grade I, National Nature Reserves, a Kent Wildlife Trust nature reserve and a Local Nature Reserve.

History 

The name "Swale" is Old English in origin, and is believed to mean "swirling, rushing river", or "rushing water".

Peri-glacial period
At these times the Swale was a gully from what had been a sea channel in very warm periods. Namely before the Strait of Dover had swept away so much swampy land, accentuated by sea levels being lower, even to beyond the end of the ice age, i.e. in the mid seventh millennium BC, the coasts of Essex and Kent stretched much further into the North Sea. Sheppey formed part of mainland Britain. The Swale was a valley opening eastwards. As sea-levels rose again, water occupied its whole length. It and the very mouth of the Medway divide the Isle of Sheppey from the mainland.

Roman Warm Period
When the Romans arrived in Britain, the Swale was much wider, with one part of the Isle of Sheppey — now called the Isle of Harty or Harty — a separate island.

Former ferries
Two  public ferries crossed the Swale. One operated between Oare and Harty, and the other between Murston (near Sittingbourne) and Elmley (another former hamlet and essentially attached islet). Harty is no longer separate but the marshlands gradually encroaching delineate it.

Dredging and channel traffic
The channel needs constant dredging for busy recreational and light vessel use.

Bridges
The Swale is crossed at its western end by two bridges: the Kingsferry Bridge and the later Sheppey Crossing.

Nature 

The Swale forms both a National Nature Reserve and a Special Protection Area: the eel grass, Ray's knotgrass, white seakale, glassworts and golden samphire support rare and uncommon migrant butterflies and moths, including the Essex emerald, the ground lackey, the clouded yellow butterfly and rare hawk-moths.
Since 1968, it has also been a Site of Special Scientific Interest.

Birds 
The Swale provides habitats for the following birds:
 Pied avocet at least 17 percent of Great Britain's breeding population
 Marsh harrier at least 15 percent of Great Britain's breeding population
 Mediterranean gull
 Bar-tailed godwit
 Eurasian golden plover
 Hen harrier
 Ringed plover
 Black-tailed godwit
 Grey plover
 knot
 pintail
 Common redshank
 Northern shoveler

See also
Swale (local government district)

References

External links 

English Nature page
Description of Special Protection Area
Map sources for 

Thames Estuary
Channels of England
Special Protection Areas in England
Sites of Special Scientific Interest in Kent
Nature Conservation Review sites
The Swale
Ramsar sites in England
Straits of England
National nature reserves in England